Bruce Francis Herbert Bayley (born 6 November 1961) is a Barbadian sailor. He competed in the Star event at the 1984 Summer Olympics.

References

External links
 

1961 births
Living people
Barbadian male sailors (sport)
Olympic sailors of Barbados
Sailors at the 1984 Summer Olympics – Star
Sportspeople from Bridgetown